Georgia State Route 21 Business may refer to:

 Georgia State Route 21 Business (Newington): a business route of State Route 21 that partially exists in Newington
 Georgia State Route 21 Business (Springfield): a former business route of State Route 21 that existed in Springfield
 Georgia State Route 21 Business (Sylvania): a business route of State Route 21 that partially exists in Sylvania

021 Business